The 1996-97 season was Motherwell's 12th consecutive season in the Scottish Premier Division, the top division of Scottish Football.

Season events
Motherwell started the season with pre-season friendlies in England against Southend United, Baldock Town and Blyth Spartans. Motherwell lost to Southend United, defeated Baldock Town and Blyth Spartans before returning to Fir Park to face Portuguese giants Porto, losing 1-0.

Squad

Transfers

In

Loans in

Out

Released

Friendlies

Competitions

Overview

Premier Division

Results summary

Results by round

Results

League table

Scottish Cup

League Cup

Statistics

Goal scorers

See also
 List of Motherwell F.C. seasons

References

1996-97
Motherwell